The Hikurangi Plateau is an oceanic plateau in the South Pacific Ocean east of the North Island of New Zealand. Mount Hikurangi, in Māori mythology the first part of the North Island to emerge from the ocean, gave its name to the plateau.

Geological setting

Hikurangi Plateau is cut by the Hikurangi Channel, a 2000 km abyssal channel that starts at Kaikoura and runs along the Hikurangi Trench as far as the Māhia Peninsula before crossing the plateau and ending in the South-west Pacific abyssal plain.

Tectonic evolution
Two models have been proposed for the formation of Hikurangi.  It can be derived from the mantle plume that caused the break-up of Gondwana and the separation of Zealandia from Antarctica 107 Ma.  Alternatively, it could have formed together with other Pacific plateaux around 120 Ma as part of the Ontong Java-Manihiki-Hikurangi mega-plateau, in which case Hikurangi must have drifted thousands of kilometres during the Cretaceous silent period (84–121 Ma) before colliding with Gondwana.

A 2010 study of isotopic data supported the mega-plateau or "Greater Ontong Java Event" model.  The study added several basins as remains of this LIP event, including the north-west part of the Central Pacific, Nauru, East Mariana, and Lyra basins — submarine volcanism that must have covered 1% of Earth's surface and had a dramatic impact on life on Earth. The samples so far taken from the three plateaus are all consistent with ages of initial formation about 124 million years ago. There are, nevertheless, traces in seamounts on Hikurangi of a second Late Cretaceous magmatic event contemporaneous with volcanism on New Zealand and associated with the final break-up of Gondwana.

With these missing portions of the plateau added to it, the Hikurangi Plateau originally must have covered , an area similar to that of the Manihiki Plateau  to the north.

The Hikurangi Plateau first subducted beneath New Zealand around 100 Ma during the Gondwana collision and it is currently subducting a second time as part of the convergence between the Pacific and Australian plates.  These subducted parts are reaching  into the mantle beneath the North Island and northern South Island.
The extent of the Hikurangi Plateau slab suggests that it has played a significant role in the geology of New Zealand during the past 100 Ma.  The Southern Alps in central South Island are being uplifted along the plate boundary there, a fault zone which parallels the western edge of the slab of the Hikurangi Plateau.

The Australian and Pacific plates converge obliquely in the Tonga-Kermadec-Hikurangi subduction zone.  The Hikurangi Plateau alters this subduction beneath North Island, at the Hikurangi subduction zone, where the buoyancy of the slab has resulted in the exposure of a forearc and hence earthquakes such as the 7.8 Mw 1931 Hawke's Bay earthquake.

See also
 Campbell Plateau
 Large low-shear-velocity provinces
 Tonga-Kermadec Ridge

References

Notes

Sources

 
 
 
 

Geography of the New Zealand seabed
Plateaus of the Pacific Ocean
Large igneous provinces